Anguish (French:Angoisse) is a 1917 French silent film directed by André Hugon and starring Paul Guidé, Albert Dieudonné and Marie-Louise Derval.

Cast
 Paul Guidé as Jacques de Lucigny  
 Albert Dieudonné as Guy de Rouvres  
 Marie-Louise Derval as Jacqueline de Rouvres

References

Bibliography
 Dayna Oscherwitz & MaryEllen Higgins. The A to Z of French Cinema. Scarecrow Press, 2009.

External links

1917 films
Films directed by André Hugon
French silent films
French black-and-white films
1910s French films